Lin Gengxin (born 13 February 1988), also known as Kenny Lin, is a Chinese actor. Lin rose to fame for his role in Scarlet Heart (2011), and has starred in several #1 box office hits such as Young Detective Dee: Rise of the Sea Dragon (2013), My Old Classmate (2014), The Taking of Tiger Mountain (2014) and Journey to the West: The Demons Strike Back (2017) as well as television series Princess Agents (2017).

Lin ranked 77th on Forbes China Celebrity 100 list in 2015, 43rd in 2017, and 84th in 2019.

Early life
Lin was born in Shenyang, Liaoning, China. He enrolled in the Shanghai Theatre Academy in 2007. During his college years, Lin appeared in low-budget films, television shows, short films and advertisements.

Career

2011–2013: Rising popularity
In 2011, Lin rose to fame with the hit drama Scarlet Heart, playing the role of 14th Prince Yinti. In 2012, Lin co-starred in xianxia drama Xuan-Yuan Sword: Scar of Sky, which was extremely popular during its run and raised his profile. In 2013, Lin successfully made his crossover to film with his role in Tsui Hark's Young Detective Dee: Rise of the Sea Dragon. He was nominated for the Best New Actor award at the 33rd Hong Kong Film Awards.

2014–present: Commercial success
In 2014, Lin starred in youth romance film My Old Classmate with Zhou Dongyu. The film was a commercial success, and won the Jury Prize at the 21st Beijing College Student Film Festival. The same year, he starred in crime action film Black & White: The Dawn of Justice; and reunited with Tsui Hark in the period action film The Taking of Tiger Mountain. The Taking of Tiger Mountain was a success, becoming one of the highest-grossing films of all time in China with US$150 million.

In 2015, Lin was cast in Chinese historical drama God of War, Zhao Yun, based on the Chinese novel Romance of the Three Kingdoms. He plays General Zhao Yun, who falls in love with a girl named Xiahou Qingyi (played by Girls' Generation's Im Yoona). The drama premiered in April 2016, and reached viewership ratings as high as 2%, and recorded more than 10 billion hits through various Chinese online videos sites. The same year, Lin headlined action comedy For a Few Bullets and martial arts film Sword Master. He also featured in Zhang Yimou's historical fantasy epic The Great Wall.

In 2017, Lin starred in Stephen Chow's Journey to the West: The Demons Strike Back, playing Sun Wukong. The film grossed $239.5 million, becoming the highest grossing film among the Journey to the West novel adaptations. The same year, he starred in historical action drama Princess Agents. The drama was a massive hit, and Lin gained renewed recognition for his portrayal of the male lead, Yuwen Yue.

In 2018, Lin reprised his role as Shatuo Zhong in Detective Dee: The Four Heavenly Kings, the third installment of the Detective Dee film series by Tsui Hark.

In 2019, Lin was cast in the crime suspense drama Lost and Love as a policeman.

Filmography

Film

Television series

Variety show

Discography

Awards and nominations

References

External links

 林更新

1988 births
Living people
Male actors from Shenyang
Shanghai Theatre Academy alumni
Chinese male film actors
Chinese male television actors
21st-century Chinese male actors